Armando Bonilla Jr. (August 9, 1946 – November 16, 2002), known as Don Armando, was an American musician.  He formed the Second Avenue Rhumba Band with vocalist Fonda Rae and scored a #1 hit on the Hot Dance Music/Club Play chart with "Deputy of Love"  in 1979.  Bonilla was also a percussionist with Dr. Buzzard's Original Savannah Band.

Biography
Armando "Sonny" Bonilla was born and raised in East Harlem, New York City, the eldest sibling of a family composed of five sons of a Puerto Rican father – Roman Armando Bonilla, the leader of the East Harlem Orchestra – and a Colombian mother. After completing a tour of duty with the United States Air Force, he graduated from New York University with a bachelor's degree in Computer Science, and later he acquired a master's degree from Columbia University. One of his younger brothers, Luis Bonilla, played congas on Larry Harlow's breakout album Heavy Smokin'''.  Another brother, Nestor, is also a professional percussionist.

He worked on Sesame Street, before joining Dr. Buzzard's Original Savannah Band.  He left in 1978 to form Don Armando's 2nd Avenue Rhumba Band. He also worked as a session musician in New York. He wrote a treatment for a sitcom called "Cowboy Tito" while living in Hollywood and was producing a musical called "The Love of a Jukebox Hero". He co-wrote "Mambo Queen" with L.A. composer Aaron Loo.  The Second Avenue Rhumba Band's song, "Goin' to a Showdown," and "Winter Love " was featured in the 1980 horror film Maniac.

Don Armando died in 2002, in Seattle, from cancer at the age of 56.

Discography
1979 Don Armando's Second Avenue Rhumba Band'' (ZE Records)
A1. "Deputy of Love"
A2. "Compliment Your Leading Lady"
A3. "Winter Love"
B1. "Goin' to a Showdown"
B2. "How to Handle a Woman"
B3. "I'm an Indian Too"
B4. "Para Ti" / "This Is Just for You"

References

See also
List of Number 1 Dance Hits (United States)
List of artists who reached number one on the US Dance chart

1946 births
2002 deaths
People from East Harlem
New York University alumni
Columbia University alumni
American disco musicians
American dance musicians
ZE Records artists
20th-century American drummers
American male drummers
20th-century American male musicians